Firmin Newton "Bill" Warwick (November 26, 1897 – December 19, 1984) was a Major League Baseball player. Warwick was a member of St. Louis' first championship team in 1926. Warwick batted and threw right-handed, and in addition was the son-in-law of former Major Leaguer George Gibson. He was born in Philadelphia, Pennsylvania, and died in San Antonio, Texas.

In 23 major league games, Warwick posted a .304 batting average (17-for-56) with 8 runs, 1 home run and 8 RBI.

External links

1897 births
1984 deaths
Major League Baseball catchers
Pittsburgh Pirates players
St. Louis Cardinals players
Baseball players from Philadelphia